Crudine Ridge Wind Farm is a 134 MW wind farm constructed and owned by CWP Renewables near Sallys Flat, 45 km south of Mudgee in New South Wales, Australia. It consists of 37 wind turbines, each rated to 3.63 MW. The towers are 91.5 metres tall, have a 137-metre rotor diameter, and a tip height of 160 metres. Commercial operations began in mid 2021. Annually, it is projected to generate 392 GWh at a capacity factor of 33.4% on average.

Operations 
The wind farm registered first output in December 2020 and reached full output in July 2021 and has operated continuously since then. The generation table uses eljmkt nemlog to obtain generation values for each month.

Note: Asterisk indicates power output was limited during the month.

References 

Wind farms in New South Wales